The 1998–99 National Professional Soccer League season was the fifteenth season for the league.

League standings

American Conference

East Division

Central Division

National Conference

North Division

Midwest Division

Playoffs

Scoring leaders

GP = Games Played, G = Goals, A = Assists, Pts = Points

League awards
 Most Valuable Player: Hector Marinaro, Cleveland
 Defender of the Year: Kevin Hundelt, St. Louis
 Rookie of the Year: Martin Nash, Edmonton
 Goalkeeper of the Year: Victor Nogueira, Milwaukee
 Coach of the Year: Ross Ongaro, Edmonton
 Playoffs MVP: Hector Marinaro, Cleveland

All-NPSL Teams

All-NPSL Rookie Teams

References
Major Indoor Soccer League II (RSSSF)

1998 in American soccer leagues
1999 in American soccer leagues
1998 in Canadian soccer
1999 in Canadian soccer
1998-99